"Je suis malade" (I am sick) is a 1973 song by Alice Dona and Serge Lama. First performed by Lama with no success, Dalida recorded the song the same year receiving widespread success.

Commercial performance 
Serge Lama's original version passed completely unnoticed while TV and radio programmers preferred the reverse side of the single, "Les p'tites femmes de Pigalle". It's also Alice Dona's best selling song.

Track listing 
7" single Philips  (1973, France etc.)
 A. "Je suis malade" (3:59)
 B. "Les p'tites femmes de Pigalle" (2:30)

Cover versions 
The song was covered, among others, by Lara Fabian (in 1994), Thierry Amiel (in 2003), Demis Roussos, the South Korean vocal quartet Forestella, and the Israeli singer Izhar Cohen.

Charts

Serge Lama version

Dalida version

References 

1973 songs
1973 singles
French songs
Serge Lama songs
Dalida songs
Lara Fabian songs
Demis Roussos songs
Songs written by Serge Lama
Philips Records singles
Songs written by Alice Dona